In the Hollows is the sixth solo album by bassist Nat Baldwin. It was released on 29 April 2014 by Western Vinyl Records.

Track listing
All songs written by Nat Baldwin.
"Wasted" – 5:20
"Knockout" – 4:38
"Half My Life" – 3:17
"In the Hollows" – 5:36
"The End of the Night" – 3:37
"Cosmos Pose" – 5:17
"Sharpshooter" – 6:10
"Bored to Death" – 4:55
"A Good Day to Die" – 5:10

Personnel
Nat Baldwin – bass, vocals
Otto Hauser – drums, percussion
Clarice Jensen – cello
Rob Moose – violin
Nadia Sirota – viola

References

2014 albums
Western Vinyl albums